Kim Yoo-kyung (born October 1, 1975) is a retired South Korean rhythmic gymnast.

She competed for South Korea in the rhythmic gymnastics all-around competition at the 1992 Olympic Games in Barcelona. She was 35th in the qualification and didn't qualify for the final.

References

External links 
 Kim Yu-Gyeong at Sports-Reference.com

1975 births
Living people
South Korean rhythmic gymnasts
Gymnasts at the 1992 Summer Olympics
Gymnasts at the 1994 Asian Games
Olympic gymnasts of South Korea
Asian Games competitors for South Korea
20th-century South Korean women